The Spanish Action Circle (Círculo de Acción Española) was a Falangist political organization in Chile associated with Francoist Spain.

References

Falangism
Defunct political parties in Chile